Chaoyang is a prefecture-level city in western Liaoning province, People's Republic of China.

With a vast land area of almost , it is by area the largest prefecture-level city in Liaoning, and borders on Hebei province and the Inner Mongolia Autonomous Region to the west.

The area under Chaoyang's jurisdictional control is split up into two counties (Jianping, Chaoyang), two urban districts (Longcheng, Shuangta), two county-level cities (Beipiao, Lingyuan), and the Harqin Left Wing Mongolian Autonomous County. The total regional population is 3 million, while the urban centre where the government office is located has a population of 430,000 and forms the core of Chaoyang.

Known as China's 'fossil city', many important paleontological discoveries have been made in Chaoyang, and the Harqin region is the oldest currently known prehistoric site in northern China.  Two of the most remarkable Early Cretaceous birds known to date were recovered in the vicinity of the Jiufotang Formation rocks and named Longipteryx chaoyangensis and Sapeornis chaoyangensis in reference to the city.

Name
The name "Chaoyang" originates from a poem found in one of the oldest collections of Chinese poetry, the Shijing. "A wutong tree grew on a mountain. A fenghuang bird perched at the top and sang towards the morning sun" (Chaoyang's name means "morning sun" in Chinese). The eastern part of Chaoyang is home to a mountain that has been called Fenghuang Mountain since ancient times. In 1778, this mountain was connected with the poem from the Shijing and Chaoyang was given its current name.

History
Chaoyang has a long and rich history. The discovery of the over five-thousand-year-old Niuheliang Hongshan Cultural Ruins in the region has drawn attention to Chaoyang as one of the birthplaces of ancient Chinese culture. The area first appears in Chinese historical records as “Liucheng County” in the Early Han period of the 3rd century B.C. In 342 AD, King of the Former Yan, Murong Huang, made Chaoyang his capital under the name Longcheng ("Dragon City"), and the city remained the capital through the Later Yan and Northern Yan periods. The center of Longcheng was located at the old town of modern Chaoyang. Since this time, Chaoyang has functioned as a center of Buddhism in Northeast China, with the construction of Longxiang temple in 345 AD forming the beginning of Buddhist culture in the Northeast.

During the Sui and Tang dynasties, Liucheng (renamed from Longcheng) was the seat of Ying Prefecture (Yingzhou, 營州). It was a prosperous multi-cultural city whose inhabitants included the Khitans, Kumo Xi, Mohe, Shiwei, Goguryeo, Göktürks and Sogdians. The Khitan general Li Guangbi of Tang dynasty, who played an instrumental role during the war against the An Lushan rebels, was a native of Liucheng. The city went into a period of decline after the An Lushan rebellion. The Liao dynasty established Ba Prefecture (霸州) at Liucheng. As its importance grew again a century later, it was renamed Xingzhong Prefecture (兴中府). The city was abandoned during the Mongol Yuan dynasty.

The Mongols seized Chaoyang and surrounding regions. When they submitted to the Manchu Qing Dynasty, Chaoyang was controlled by Chinggisid princes and descendants of Jelme. Their territories became Tümed Right Wing Banner, Kharachin Left Wing Banner, Kharachin Right Wing Banner, and Kharachin Middle Banner, all of which were under Josutu League.

Although the Qing officially prohibited the Chinese from immigrating to Mongol lands, the southernmost league of Mongolia was flooded by Chinese peasants. As a result, several Chinese prefectures were created within the Mongol lands, and the Chinese came under the jurisdiction of the neighboring Chengde-fu. Chaoyang County was established in 1778, with its seat at the old town of Chaoyang.

In 1891, a Chinese secret society named Jindandao raised a rebellion, massacring tens of thousands of Mongols and forcing survivors to flee northward.

Under Manchukuo, the eastern part of Chaoyang, including the city of Chaoyang, belonged to Kin-chow Province while the western part constituted Jehol Province. The People's Republic of China incorporated Chaoyang into Liaoning Province in 1955 although ethnic Mongols wished to join Inner Mongolia. It was declared a prefecture level city in 1984.

Geography and climate
Chaoyang has a rather dry, monsoon-influenced humid continental climate/semi-arid climate (Köppen climate classification: Dwa/BSk), with cold but very dry winters, and hot, humid summers; spring and autumn are relatively brief. A majority of the annual rainfall occurs in July and August alone. Due to the aridity, diurnal temperature variation is large, especially during spring and autumn, and averages  annually. With monthly percent possible sunshine ranging from 50% in July to 71% in January, the city averages 2,748 hours of bright sunshine annually.

Administrative divisions
The prefecture is divided into 7 administrative areas. There are 2 districts, 2 subordinate cities and 3 counties of which one county is an Autonomous County for the Mongolian minority.

Economy
Agriculture forms the backbone of Chaoyang's economy. In addition to wheat, corn, beans, and potatoes, Chaoyang is also an important region for the growing of cotton and fruit. The city has also begun to venture into the production of shaji (sea-buckthorn berries), which have become popular in China because of their dual use as food and as medicine. Chaoyang is home to the largest man-made thicket of shaji.

Chaoyang has more than 1,600 industrial enterprises, manufacturing a wide range of products including steel, machinery, textiles, diesel engines, automobiles, and paper. Lingyuan Iron and Steel Works and the Liaoning Tyre Factory are two of the largest such enterprises.

The city is served by Chaoyang Airport.

Fossils
Liaoning, and in particular Chaoyang, has become the focus of great interest in the world of palaeontology. During the 1990s, many new, unique and fascinating fossils were discovered in this region. Some of the finds have completely revolutionised our ideas of dinosaurs and shed new light on the origin of birds. Chaoyang's fossils are in the Jiufotang Formation. These fossils include: Liaoxipterus, a genus of ctenochasmatid pterodactyloid pterosaur from the Lower Cretaceous; Microraptor, a feathered dinosaur; and several early birds such as Longipteryx, Sapeornis, Yanornis and Jeholornis, an early bird. Insects have also been found such as Dictyoptera, a fossilised cockroach and Hymenoptera, a fossil bee, which also date to the Lower Cretaceous period. A local trade in rare fossils has developed in the wake of the finds, with an estimated sixty vendors gathering in one area, called Ancient Street.

Friendship cities
 Obihiro, Hokkaido, Japan - (2000)

References

 
Cities in Liaoning
Prefecture-level divisions of Liaoning